Until 1 January 2007 Midtdjurs ("Central Djursland") was a municipality (Danish, kommune) in the former Aarhus County on the Jutland peninsula in central Denmark.  The municipality, in the middle of a region known as Djursland, covered an area of 179 km2, and had a total population of 7.763 (2005).  Its last mayor was Kim Dalgaard Poulsen, a member of the Venstre (Liberal Party) political party. The main town and the site of its municipal council was the town of Kolind.

Midtdjurs municipality ceased to exist as the result of Kommunalreformen ("The Municipality Reform" of 2007).  It was merged with existing Ebeltoft, Rosenholm, and Rønde municipalities to form the new Syddjurs municipality.  This created a municipality with an area of 693 km2 and a total population of 40,196 (2005).  The new municipality belongs to Region Midtjylland ("Mid-Jutland Region").

References 
 Municipal statistics: NetBorger Kommunefakta, delivered from KMD aka Kommunedata (Municipal Data)
 Municipal mergers and neighbors: Eniro new municipalities map

External links 
 Syddjurs municipality's official website (Danish only)

Former municipalities of Denmark